Reading Youth Orchestra (RYO) is one of the oldest youth orchestras in the United Kingdom. It was formed in 1944 with just eleven members and has a history rooted strongly in the British Youth and Community Service. It is open to all young people in the general area of Reading in the English county of Berkshire; admission is by audition. The orchestra, whose members range from fourteen to nineteen years of age, meets on Friday evenings to prepare for its three annual concerts. The orchestra celebrated its 60th birthday in 2004.

RYO has toured to European cities and regularly holds summer courses.

Reading Youth Orchestra is supported by Friends of RYO (FRYO).

History (1944–1954)
Reading Youth Orchestra was founded in 1944, after the Youth Committee of the time had begun instrumental lessons for modest fees (sixpence, or 2.5p today). The conductor was Humphrey Hare, senior science master at Leighton Park and amateur musician. It had its first rehearsal on 29 October 1944, with 11 players, many of whom could not even read music. This number slowly increased, fed by pupils from Leighton Park and Kendrick Schools, and some of the teachers playing along.

In March 1945, the orchestra made its debut in a small-scale concert playing simple pieces like Handel's Scipio. On 16 November 1945, the orchestra performed for the first time movements from major works in a joint concert with Reading Youth Choir. The programme included Strauss' Blue Danube waltz.

In 1947, RYO went on their first tour to Zaandam in the Netherlands.

The concert of February 1948 saw the premiere of a Fugue specially composed for, and dedicated to Reading Youth Orchestra by Humphrey Hare. This fugue is featured on one of the 78 RPM records recorded on 23 May at Leighton Park.

On 8 August 1949, the now sixty strong orchestra went to Düsseldorf for a week's visit during which they gave four concerts, which were very much appreciated by local people who came to see them.

The fifth anniversary concert in March 1950 marked the five years since the first concert in March 1945.

In August 1950, RYO toured again to Germany. The cost to members was £13.00. Five concerts were given, finishing with a return visit to Düsseldorf.

The tour to Denmark in August 1951 was organised by RYO's new conductor, Mark Wigram, at the Invitation of the World Friendship Association. The orchestra travelled as two separate parties. One travelled by air and had five days in Denmark before the other party arrived. The other party travelled by sea and stayed on a further five days after the air party had left. In addition to the usual sight seeing program, which included the Carlsberg breweries. The orchestra gave three concerts. The second concert was notable because part of it was broadcast on Danish National Radio. The final concert of the tour was given in the concert hall of the Tivoli Gardens in Copenhagen.

Mark Wigram's last concert with RYO, in February 1952, included the first public performance of Serenade (for small orchestra) by Richard Bennett, now Richard Rodney Bennett, who played in the percussion section of the orchestra. In 1959, at the age of 23, Bennett also composed an overture that was dedicated to Reading Youth Orchestra. This remained unplayed for many years in its full orchestral form, although it received its first public performance as part of the fiftieth anniversary celebrations in 1994.

The concert given in June 1953 celebrated the Coronation of Her Majesty Queen Elizabeth II.

The tenth anniversary concert, conducted by John Russell, was held in the town hall on Friday, 16 July 1954. During the concert, Gwynneth Reed was presented with a bouquet of flowers and later a brooch after six years with the orchestra. Following the tenth anniversary concert, John Russell handed over the baton to Edward Underhill who had been deputy conductor since the early years of the orchestra's life.

Conductors
1944–1949 Humphrey Hare
1950–1952 Mark Wigram
1952–1954 John Russell
1954–1974 Edward Underhill
1974–1976 Roy Goodman
1976–1997 Robert Roscoe
1997–2000 Rupert D'Cruze
2000–2006 Christopher Walker
2006–2020 Paul Cox
2020– Mel Le Breuilly

Leaders

1948–1954 Gwynneth Reed
1954–1955 David Gribble
1955–1957 Margaret Martin
1957–1960 Vivienne Martin
1960–1962 Ronald Colyer
1962–1966 Susan Armitage
1966–1969 Stephen Lustig
1969–1970 John Berridge
1970–1972 Jane Chrzanowska
1972–1973 Penelope Gouk
1973–1977 Rosemary Seward
1977–1979 Colin Albery
1979–1981 Karen Fawcett
1981–1982 Edward Morton
1982–1983 Rebecca Richardson
1983–1985 Sarah Ewins
1985–1986 Patrick Evans
1986–1987 Hannah Lynch
1987–1989 Philip Montgomery-Smith
1989–1990 Guy Haskell
1990–1991 Laura Dudeney
1991–1993 Richard Briggs
1993–1995 Hannah Rowley
1995–1996 Catherine Offord
1996–1997 Hui Hui Ng
1997–1998 Emma Gostling
1998–1999 Rachel Rowntree
1999–2000 Nick Sexton
2000–2001 Biddy McClure
2001 Nathalie Dudman
2001–2004 Tim Hawken
2004–2005 Lucy Deeks
2005–2006 Arangan Nagendran
2006–2008 Lauren Willis
2008–2009 Laurence Beveridge
2009–2017 Rachel Newman
2018–2021 Euon Mallett

Notable alumni
Richard Rodney Bennett, composer
Robin Lustig, journalist
Pip Eastop, French horn player
Elspeth Dutch, French horn player

See also 
List of youth orchestras

References

External links

English youth orchestras